Kiliba is a town in the Democratic Republic of Congo, located just north of the northern tip of Lake Tanganyika in the province of South Kivu.  It is located about 17 km from Bujumbura, the largest city and former capital of Burundi, and 25 km north of Uvira. The primary spoken language is Kifulero, although Kiswahili (an East African trade language) and French are also spoken.

It is located at the base of the Mitumba Mountains (which lie to the west) in the Ruzizi Valley. It was once the site of the sugar cane mill of Sucraf-Sucki,  the second largest and oldest sugar mill in the DRC. The factory was destroyed in the civil war which started in 1998.
The factory is currently under rehabilitation as from 2019.

References

 African Development Bank. Republic of Zaire Completion Report Kiliba Sugar Complex Rehabilitation and Extension Project. African Development Bank, Oct. 1995. African         Development Bank, www.afdb.org/fileadmin/uploads/afdb/Documents/Project-and-Operations/ADB-BD-IF-97-156-EN-SCANNEDIMAGE.079.PDF. Accessed 28 Sept. 2021.

Populated places in South Kivu
Refugee camps in Africa
Burundi–Democratic Republic of the Congo border crossings